Gymnadenia widderi is a species of orchid native to the central Alps and central Italy.

References 

widderi